Any Woman is a 1925 American silent drama film directed by Henry King and written by Randolph Bartlett, Jules Furthman, Arthur Somers Roche and Beatrice Van. The film stars Alice Terry, Donald Reed, Margarita Fischer, Lawson Butt, Aggie Herring, James Neill, and Henry Kolker. The film was released on May 4, 1925, by Paramount Pictures.

Plot
As described in a film magazine review, when Ellen Linden returns home, she finds her father ill and without funds. She immediately goes to work for James Rand and Egbert Phillips. She grows friendly with James, which makes Egbert jealous, although both are married men. Tom Galloway, a young friend of her father, loves her, but leaves for Europe. While he is there, she becomes innocently compromised with James, and his wife names her as a co-respondent in a suit for divorce. After the divorce, James proposes but Ellen turns him down. Tom returns, but writes to Ellen that he is sailing to Honolulu and wishes her happiness. She races for the ship and tells him that she is going with him on a honeymoon cruise.

Cast

Preservation
With no prints of Any Woman located in any film archives, it is a lost film.

References

External links
 
 

1925 films
1920s English-language films
Silent American drama films
1925 drama films
1925 lost films
Paramount Pictures films
Films directed by Henry King
American black-and-white films
American silent feature films
Lost American films
Lost drama films
1920s American films